Litton Kumer Das (Bengali: লিটন কুমার দাস; born 16 February 1994) is a Bangladeshi cricketer. He is a right-handed batsman and a test wicket-keeper. He made his international debut for Bangladesh in June 2015. He has scored the highest individual score for Bangladesh in ODI cricket (176).

Personal life 
Litton Kumer Das was born in Dinajpur, Bangladesh. He hails from a traditional Bengali Hindu  Kayastha  family. His father name is Bacchu Chandra Das and mother name Anita Das. He has two brothers. He followed a common route to become a cricketer in Bangladesh. He studied in BKSP and played for age level teams.

On 28 July 2019, he married his long-time girlfriend Devashri Biswas Sonchita who is an agriculturist in Mirpur, Bangladesh.

Domestic and T20 career
Das played for Bangladesh at the Under-19 World Cups in 2012 and 2014. Playing for Rangpur Division in the 2014–15 National Cricket League, he scored five centuries and finished the seven-match season with 1,024 runs at an average of 85.33. Rangpur Division won the championship.

In January 2017, Das scored his maiden double-century in first-class cricket, playing for East Zone in the 2016–17 Bangladesh Cricket League. As a result of this, he was recalled to Bangladesh's Test squad for their one-off match against India in February 2017.

Das scored the most runs in the 2016–17 Dhaka Premier Division Cricket League, with 752 in 14 matches.

In April 2018, Das was the leading run-scorer in the 2017–18 Bangladesh Cricket League, with 779 runs in six matches, including scoring 274 runs in one innings.

In October 2018, Das was named in the squad for the Sylhet Sixers team, following the draft for the 2018–19 Bangladesh Premier League. He played for Jamaica Tallawahs in the 2019 Caribbean Premier League, making his first appearance in an overseas franchise league. He scored 44 runs in two matches in the tournament. In November 2019, he was selected to play for the Rajshahi Royals in the 2019–20 Bangladesh Premier League, scoring 455 runs in the tournament.

Das played for Gazi Group Barishal in the 2020-21 Bangabandhu T20 Cup. In April 2021, he was signed by Karachi Kings to play in the rescheduled matches in the 2021 Pakistan Super League.

International career

2015-2019
Das made his Test debut against India on 10 June 2015. He made his One Day International debut, also against India, on 18 June 2015. He made his Twenty20 International debut against South Africa on 5 July 2015.

On 2 March 2017, Bangladesh's captain Mushfiqur Rahim was asked to play as a batsman only, with Das becoming the wicket-keeper for the Test series against Sri Lanka.

In June 2018, Bangladesh toured West Indies and United States for  two Tests, three One Day Internationals (ODIs) and three Twenty20 International.
In the first test, Bangladesh recorded their lowest team total in Tests with Das managing to enter double figures among other batters- a mere 25 off 53 balls in a losing cause making a record for Das. In the third t20 match against West Indies, he reached his first white-ball half-century off 24 balls, and his first 50-plus score in 17 innings scoring  61 runs eventually sealing the T20I series 2-1 and also ended up winning the Player of the match award.

On 28 September 2018, against India in the final of the 2018 Asia Cup, Das scored his maiden ODI century and went on to make 121(117) with 12 boundaries and 2 sixes. He would eventually win “Man of the Match” for his effort, despite Bangladesh losing the match off the final ball.

In April 2019, Das was named in Bangladesh's squad for the 2019 Cricket World Cup.
He made his World Cup debut against the West Indies where he scored an unbeaten 94 runs and made an unbeaten 189-run partnership with Shakib Al Hasan which helped Bangladesh to a famous 7 wicket victory.

2020–2022
In March 2020, when Zimbabwe toured Bangladesh, in the first ODI, Das scored 126 runs, his second century in ODI and became the first Bangladeshi batsman to score a century at Sylhet. In the 3rd ODI, he scored his 1000th run in ODIs and then along with Tamim Iqbal made the highest partnership for Bangladesh for any wicket in ODIs (292 runs) as well as scoring 176 runs off 143 balls. He made the highest individual score by any Bangladeshi batsman in ODIs. Das scored 311 runs at an average of 103.68 in the ODI series and eventually become the "Player of the Tournament" jointly with Tamim Iqbal.

In February 2021, when West Indies toured Bangladesh, he was one of the leading run-scorers and the highest run scorer for Bangladesh in the Test series, scoring 200 runs including two half-centuries.

In March 2021 Bangladesh toured New Zealand for 3-match ODI and T20I series. He failed with bat in both ODI and T20I series. In the third T20I, he captained Bangladesh for the first time in T20I in the absence of regular captain Mahmudullah who as ruled out due to an injury and Bangladesh lost the rain curtailed 10-overs match by 65 runs and eventually lost the T20I series by 3–0 as well.

In June 2021, he was named in the Bangladesh's squad across all formats for their tour to Zimbabwe. During the first innings of the one-off Test against Zimbabwe, he ended up five runs short of his maiden Test century, He along with Mahmudullah, sustained a 138-runs partnership, which was the second highest seventh wicket partnership and the highest seventh wicket partnership for Bangladesh in Tests.

In September 2021, he was named in Bangladesh's squad for the 2021 ICC Men's T20 World Cup. In November 2021, in the first match against Pakistan, Das scored his first century in Test cricket.

In January, 2022 when Bangladesh toured New Zealand for a two-test series, he played an important knock of 86 runs in registering Bangladesh's first ever win in New Zealand and first ever test victory against New Zealand at Bay Oval. In the second test, he notched up 102 runs off 114 balls in their second innings, which was his first test century in away matches. However, Bangladesh lost the match by an innings and 117 runs. He was the highest run getter for Bangladesh in the series gathering 196 runs in 2 matches.

As of January 2022, he attained his career best test ranking of no 12 as a Test batsman of the world in the ICC Men's Player Rankings which is the highest in the history of Bangladesh cricket.

In February 2022, in a 3-match ODI series against Afghanistan, he scored 223 runs including a century and a half century and was adjusted Player of the series. He also played a crucial role in winning their first ever ODI series against South Africa, scoring 113 runs in the series, being the second highest run-getter, at an average of 37.67. Though he could not perform well in the 2-match test series scoring only 81 runs in 4 innings.

In May 2022, In the 2-match test series, against Sri Lanka, he scored 88, 141 and 52 in three innings which promoted him to the 12th position in the ICC Men's Test Batsmen ranking with 724 rating points, which is the highest points for any Bangladeshi batter in Test cricket.

As Vice Captain (2022–Present)
In May 2022, after Bangladesh lost their 2-test match series against Sri Lanka by 1–0, the test captain Mominul Haque stepped down from the captaincy and on 2 June 2022, Shakib Al Hasan succeeded him while Das was made the Vice-captain of the test team.

References

External links 

1994 births
Living people
Bangladesh Test cricketers
Bangladesh One Day International cricketers
Bangladesh Twenty20 International cricketers
Dhaka Dominators cricketers
Rangpur Division cricketers
People from Dinajpur District, Bangladesh
Comilla Victorians cricketers
Sylhet Strikers cricketers
Abahani Limited cricketers
Prime Bank Cricket Club cricketers
Bangladeshi cricketers
Bangladeshi Hindus
Bangladesh East Zone cricketers
Bangladesh under-23 cricketers
Bangladesh A cricketers
Wicket-keepers